Galiny  is a village in the administrative district of Gmina Bartoszyce, within Bartoszyce County, Warmian-Masurian Voivodeship, in northern Poland, close to the border with the Kaliningrad Oblast of Russia.

The village was first mentioned in 1336. In 1468 the Grand Master of the Teutonic Knights Heinrich Reuss von Plauen gave the village as a fief to Went von Eulenburg (Yleburg), a member of the House of Wettin, and Gallingen remained property of the Eulenburg family until 1945, when the last owner Botho Wendt zu Eulenburg, was deported to the Soviet Union.

The manor house dates back to 1589 and was built by Botho zu Eulenburg. Initially it had the shape of an "U" and was surrounded by a water-filled moat and a drawbridge. The manor was not destroyed throughout World War II but slowly fell into ruins in the postwar years. Since 1995 it is reconstructed and today used as a hotel.

References

External links 

 Galiny Palace

Galiny